Jitendra Malik is an Indian-American academic who is the Arthur J. Chick Professor of Electrical Engineering and Computer Sciences at the University of California, Berkeley.
He is known for his research in computer vision.

Academic biography 
Malik was born in Mathura, India, on October 11, 1960. He did his schooling from Jabalpur, at the St. Aloysius Senior Secondary School. He received the BTech degree in electrical engineering from Indian Institute of Technology Kanpur in 1980 and the PhD degree in computer science from Stanford University in 1985. In January 1986, he joined the University of California, Berkeley, where he is currently the Arthur J. Chick Professor in the Computer Science Division, Department of Electrical Engineering and Computer Sciences (EECS). He is also on the faculty of the department of Bioengineering, and the Cognitive Science and Vision Science groups. He served as the chair of the Computer Science Division during 2002–2004 and as the department chair of EECS during 2004–2006 and 2016–2017. Since January 2018, he is also the research director and site lead of Facebook AI Research in Menlo Park, where he leads a team of researchers and engineers in computer vision, machine learning and robotics.

Research 
Malik's research group has worked on many different topics in computer vision, computational modeling of human vision, computer graphics and the analysis of biological images. He has mentored over 60 PhD students and postdoctoral fellows, a number of whom hold faculty appointments at major universities in the US—including MIT, UC Berkeley, CMU, Caltech, Cornell, UIUC, U. Penn, and U. Michigan—and around the world. Several well-known concepts and algorithms arose in this research, such as anisotropic diffusion, normalized cuts, high dynamic range imaging, shape context and R-CNN. According to Google Scholar, his works have been cited over 150,000 times with h-index of 124, i10-index of 278 and over 20 of his papers have received more than a thousand citations each. He is one of ISI's Highly Cited Researchers in engineering. He has served on the Engineering and Computer Science jury for the Infosys Prize from 2019.

He received the gold medal for the best graduating student in electrical engineering from IIT Kanpur in 1980 and a Presidential Young Investigator Award in 1989. At UC Berkeley, he was selected for the Diane S. McEntyre Award for Excellence in teaching in 2000, a Miller Research Professorship in 2001, and appointed to be the Arthur J. Chick Professor in 2002. He received the Distinguished Alumnus Award from IIT Kanpur in 2008. He was awarded the Longuet-Higgins Prize in 2007 and 2008 and the Helmholtz Prize twice in 2015 for contributions that have stood the test of time (awarded to papers after 10 years of publication). He is a fellow of the IEEE, the ACM, the American Academy of Arts and Sciences and a member of the National Academy of Engineering. and the National Academy of Sciences. He is also the recipient of the PAMI-TC Distinguished Researcher Award (2013) the K.S. Fu Prize (2014), the ACM - AAAI Allen Newell Award (2016) the IJCAI Award for Research Excellence in AI (2018). He was awarded the 2019 IEEE Computer Society's Computer Pioneer Award for his "leading role in developing Computer Vision into a thriving discipline through pioneering research, leadership, and mentorship".

References

External links
Home page at UC Berkeley

1960 births
Living people
IIT Kanpur alumni
Stanford University School of Engineering alumni
People from Mathura
Computer vision researchers
Fellows of the Association for Computing Machinery
Fellow Members of the IEEE
Members of the United States National Academy of Engineering
Members of the United States National Academy of Sciences
UC Berkeley College of Engineering faculty
Fellows of the American Academy of Arts and Sciences
Indian emigrants to the United States
American academics of Indian descent